HAT-P-12 is a magnitude 13 low-metallicity K dwarf star approximately 463 light years away in the constellation Canes Venatici.

Planetary system
In 2009 an exoplanet, HAT-P-12b, was discovered by the HATNet Project orbiting this star. The planet was discovered using the transit method and confirmed by follow up radial velocity measurements. Transit-timing variations suggest the possible presence of additional non-transiting planets in the system.

In August 2022, this planetary system was included among 20 systems to be named by the third NameExoWorlds project.

See also
 List of extrasolar planets

References

External links
 

K-type main-sequence stars
Canes Venatici
Planetary systems with one confirmed planet
Planetary transit variables
J13573347+4329367